People's Artist of the USSR, also sometimes translated as National Artist of the USSR, was an honorary title granted to artists of the Soviet Union.

The term is confusingly used to translate two Russian language titles: Народный артист СССР (Narodny artist SSSR), awarded in performing arts and Народный художник СССР (Narodny khudozhnik SSSR), granted in some visual arts. As those titles were granted by the government, honorees were afforded certain privileges and would often receive commissions from the Minister of Culture of the Soviet Union. Accordingly, artists and authors who expressed criticism of the Communist Party were seldom granted such recognition, if not outright censored.

Each Soviet Republic, as well as the Autonomous Republics (ASSRs), had a similar award held previously by virtually every receiver of the higher title of People's Artist of the USSR.

Performing arts
The title was bestowed for exceptional achievements in the performing arts in the Soviet Union. Its recipients included many of the most-acclaimed composers, dancers, singers, film and theatre directors and actors of every Soviet republic. In all, there were 1006 recipients of the award.

The title was introduced in 1936, replacing the earlier title of "People's Artist of the Republic". The first recipients of the title (6 September 1936) were Konstantin Stanislavski, Vladimir Nemirovich-Danchenko, Ivan Moskvin, Antonina Nezhdanova, Boris Shchukin, Kulyash Baiseitova and some other actors. The last persons to be honored with the title were Sofia Pilyavskaya and Oleg Yankovsky (21 December 1991).

Originally, the title was bestowed on theatre actors, ballet dancers, and opera singers only. Gradually, it came to be bestowed upon film actors (e.g., Lyubov Orlova), composers (e.g., Arno Babajanian, Dmitri Shostakovich), violinists (e.g. David Oistrakh), pop singers (e.g., Leonid Utyosov), comedians (e.g., Arkady Raikin), and even circus performers such as Natalya Durova and Oleg Popov.

Normally, a person was named the People's Artist of the USSR after 40 years of age. Exceptions were made for dancers, e.g., Nadezhda Pavlova, a ballet artist, received the title at the age of 28, and Malika Kalontarova, a famous Bukharian Jewish folk dancer from Tajikistan, received the title at the age of 34.

The youngest female persons to receive this title were Kazakh opera singers Kulyash Baiseitova (1936) and Halima Nosirova (1937) (at the age of 24). The youngest male person was the Azerbaijani baritone operatic and pop singer Muslim Magomayev (1973) (at the age of 31). Among the actors, the youngest recipient was Sergei Bondarchuk (age 32). The youngest actress to receive the title was Yuri Andropov's daughter-in-law, Lyudmila Chursina, at age 40.

Sofia Rotaru, for example, was named Merited Artist of the Ukrainian SSR in 1973, People's Artist of the Ukrainian SSR in 1976, People's Artist of the Moldavian SSR in 1983, an attained cumulation of People's Artist titles, and finally People's Artist of the Soviet Union in 1988, the first female pop-singer to be honored with this award and the only one with three People's Artists.

Visual arts

The title of People's Painter of the USSR (Народный художник СССР) was awarded for exceptional achievements in certain visual arts: painting, sculpture, drawing, and photography. The lesser title of Meritorious Painter of the USSR (Заслуженный художник СССР) was also awarded for achievement in these fields.

Other honored professions
People's Architect of the USSR: Народный архитектор СССР
People's Teacher of the USSR: Народный учитель СССР
People's Doctor of the USSR: Народный врач СССР

See also 
 List of People's Artists of the USSR
 People's Artist of the RSFSR
 People's Artist of the Ukrainian SSR
 People's Artist of the Tajik SSR
 People's Artist of the Lithuanian SSR
 People's Artist of the Armenian SSR
 List of People's Artists of the Azerbaijan SSR
 Merited Artist
 People's Artist

References

External links 

 Russian Academy of Art

Awards established in 1936
Awards disestablished in 1991
Honorary titles of the Soviet Union
USSR